"Kanashimi no Kizu" (Scars of Sadness) is Nana Kitade's sixth single. It debuted at #26 and charted for 5 weeks on the Oricon Charts. Kanashimi no kizu was the theme song of PS2 game Fullmetal Alchemist 3: Kami wo Tsugu Shoujo.

Video information
The video feature's Kitade coming outside of a door and playing the guitar. It also features flowers that burn and elements of nature such as snow and heat.

Track listing
Kanashimi no Kizu (Scars of Sadness)
Call Me
Kanashimi no Kizu (Instrumental)

Charts

2005 singles
Nana Kitade songs
Songs written by Nana Kitade
2005 songs